Brownlow Hill is a small village in the Macarthur Region of New South Wales, Australia, in the Wollondilly Shire. It is north-west of the main town of Camden.

Heritage listings 
Orangeville has a number of heritage-listed sites, including:

 Brownlow Hill Loop Road, Brownlow Hill: Brownlow Hill Estate

References

Localities in New South Wales
Wollondilly Shire